Greg Pearce is a footballer who played in The Football League for Chesterfield. He made 50 league appearances for the Spireites

References

English footballers
Chesterfield F.C. players
English Football League players
1980 births
Living people
Footballers from Bolton
Association football defenders